Ischnocampa sordida is a moth of the family Erebidae. It was described by Felder in 1874. It is found in Colombia, Bolivia and Peru.

References

Ischnocampa
Moths described in 1874